Tylor is an English surname and given name meaning “tiler”.

Tylor (surname)
Charles Tylor (1816–1902), British minister and author
Edward Burnett Tylor (1832–1917), British anthropologist
Jud Tylor (born 1979), Canadian actress
Mary Tylor (died 1887), first wife of George Cadbury
Stella Elmendorf Tylor (1885–1980), American artist
Theodore Tylor (1900–1968), British lawyer and international level chess player

Tylor (given name) 
Tylor Megill (born 1995), baseball player for the New York Mets
Edward Tylor Miller (1895–1968), U.S. politician

Fictional characters
Lt. Commander Justy Ueki Tylor, a fictional character in the series The Irresponsible Captain Tylor

See also 
Tyler (disambiguation)
Taylor (disambiguation)